Sokhib Suvonkulov (born 15 September 1988) is a retired Tajikistani football player.

Career

Club
Suvonkulov played for both Vakhsh Qurghonteppa and FC Istiklol before signing for Azerbaijan Premier League side Ravan Baku in August 2013. Suvonkulov made his debut for Ravan Baku in their 3–0 away defeat to Gabala on 20 September 2013, playing all 90 minutes. His first goal for Ravan came on 4 October 2013 in a 1–1 home draw against Khazar Lankaran. Suvonkulov left Ravan in December 2013.

After six-months recovering from an Inflamed Liver, Suvonkulov began train with former club FC Istiklol in July 2014, going on to sign with them before being loaned out to Vakhsh for the remainder of the 2014 season, returning to Istiklol in January 2015.

In December 2015, Suvonkulov underwent surgery to repair the ruptured anterior cruciate ligament in his right knee, returning to light training in April 2016, and then full training with Istiklol in July 2016.

In August 2017, Suvonkulov terminated his contract with Istiklol by mutual consent, being linked with Vakhsh Qurghonteppa, before signing with Regar-TadAZ Tursunzoda.

International
Suvonkulov played for Tajikistan in 2008 AFC Challenge Cup, 2010 AFC Challenge Cup, 2012 AFC Challenge Cup.

Career statistics

Club

International

Statistics accurate as of match played 16 June 2015

International goals

Non-FIFA Goals

Honors
Istiklol
Tajik League (1): 2015
AFC President's Cup (1): 2012
 Tajik Supercup (1) : 2015

References

External links

1988 births
Living people
Tajikistani footballers
Tajikistan international footballers
Tajikistani expatriate footballers
Expatriate footballers in Azerbaijan
Vakhsh Qurghonteppa players
Ravan Baku FC players
FC Istiklol players
Association football defenders